Takao Ozawa v. United States, 260 U.S. 178 (1922), was a US legal proceeding. The United States Supreme Court found Takao Ozawa, a Japanese American who was born in Japan but had lived in the United States for 20 years, ineligible for naturalization. In 1914, Ozawa filed for US citizenship under the Naturalization Act of 1906. This act allowed only "free white persons" and "persons of African nativity or persons of African descent" to naturalize. Ozawa did not challenge the constitutionality of the racial restrictions. Instead, he claimed that Japanese people should be properly classified as "free white persons".

Background 

Takao Ozawa was born on June 15, 1875 in Kanagawa, Japan. In 1894, he moved to San Francisco, California, where he attended school. After he graduated from Berkeley High School, Ozawa attended the University of California. In 1906, after graduating, he moved to Honolulu, Hawaii. After settling down in Honolulu, Ozawa learned English fluently, practiced Christianity, and obtained a job at an American company. While in Hawaii, he married a Japanese woman with whom he had two children. Ozawa's wife studied in the United States. His family spoke fluent English and focused on American culture more than they did on Japanese culture.

On October 16, 1914, Takao Ozawa decided to apply for citizenship since he had lived in America for 20 years. Despite his US education, Ozawa did not get his citizenship easily. Ozawa tried to petition under the naturalization law, but he was ineligible as he was classified as Japanese.

The courts' reaction
Writing for a unanimous Court, Justice George Sutherland approved a line that lower court cases held, stating that "the words 'white person was only to indicate a person of what is popularly known as the Caucasian race." The courts stated that the Japanese were not considered as "free white persons" within the meaning of the law. Justice Sutherland wrote that the lower courts' conclusion that the Japanese were not "free white persons" for purposes of naturalization had “become so well established by judicial and executive concurrence and legislative acquiescence that we should not at this late day feel at liberty to disturb it, in the absence of reasons far more cogent than any that have been suggested." The Court declined to review the ethnological authorities relied on by the lower courts to support their conclusion or those advanced by the parties.

Effects
On the same day, the Supreme Court released its ruling in Yamashita v. Hinkle, which upheld Washington state's alien land law.

Within three months, Justice Sutherland authored a ruling in a Supreme Court case concerning the petition for naturalization of a Sikh immigrant from the Punjab region in British India, who identified himself as "a high caste Hindu of full Indian blood" in his petition, United States v. Bhagat Singh Thind. The upshot of this ruling was that, as with the Japanese, "high-caste Hindus, of full Indian blood" were not "free white persons" and were racially ineligible for naturalized citizenship. To support this conclusion, Justice Sutherland reiterated Ozawa's holding that the words "white person" in the naturalization act were "synonymous with the word 'Caucasian' only as that word is popularly understood".

Reaction

Writing in Foreign Affairs in 1923, Leslie Buell, author, editor, and policy researcher said, "The Japanese are now confronted with the unpalatable fact, laid down in unmistakable terms by the highest court in the land, that we consider them unfit to become Americans."

Ozawa's case did not depend on "any suggestion of individual unworthiness or racial inferiority". The argument was that if Ozawa was denied citizenship based on his race, did the law consider the Japanese people an inferior race and Caucasians a superior race? Ozawa argued that his skin was the same color, if not whiter than other Caucasians. The case allowed for anti-Japanese proponents to justify the passing of the Immigration Act of 1924, which prohibited the immigration of people from Asia to the United States. Some West Coast newspapers expressed satisfaction with the Ozawa decision, though the Sacramento Bee called for a constitutional amendment “which would confine citizenship by right of birth in this country to those whose parents were themselves eligible to citizenship.”

Japan is a strict jus sanguinis state as opposed to jus soli state, meaning that it attributes citizenship by blood and not by location of birth. In practice, it can be by parentage and not by descent.

See also
List of United States Supreme Court cases, volume 260

References

External links
 
 
 "Ozawa v. the United States," Densho Encyclopedia article

Japanese-American history
Asian-American issues
United States equal protection case law
History of civil rights in the United States
History of immigration to the United States
United States Supreme Court cases
United States immigration and naturalization case law
1922 in United States case law
United States Supreme Court cases of the Taft Court
Race and law in the United States